The Journal of the American Medical Directors Association (JAMDA) is a peer-reviewed medical journal published by Elsevier twelve times a year as of January 2013 (9 times per year 2000-2012). It is the official journal of the American Medical Directors Association. The journal covers all aspects of long-term care and geriatrics. JAMDA's readership includes internists, family/general practitioners, nurses, rehabilitation therapists, researchers and persons interested in caring for older persons.

Abstracting and indexing 
The journal is abstracted and indexed in:
 Excerpta Medica
 MEDLINE/PubMed
 EMBASE
 Current Contents/Clinical Medicine
 CINAHL
 Science Citation Index Expanded

The Journal was placed as the most highly ranked of any of the clinical geriatric journals in 2012 with an impact factor of 5.302 and immediacy index of 1.343. The increase in the number of issues together with the online only publications has led to a major increase in the denominator for calculating the 2013 impact factor, which fell to 4.781 but still gave JAMDA the second highest impact factor of all the clinical geriatric journals. In 2013, JAMDA also had the highest immediacy index of 1.483 among all the clinical geriatric journals. In 2017, the journal's impact factor was 5.325.

History
AMDA was established in 1978 by James Patee and herman Gruber near Hilton Head, Georgia. In 1988 it moved to Washington, DC. It has developed a Certified Medical Director program. It produces JAMDA (first known as the Annals of Long term Care, then renamed the Journal of the American Medical Directors Association in 2000. The first Editor-in-Chief was Dan Osterweil, MD. The 2nd Editor-in-Chief is John E. Morley, MB, BCh, Division of Geriatric Medicine, Saint Louis University School of Medicine, St. Louis, Missouri. The current Editors-in-Chief are Philip Sloane, MD, MPH and Sheryl Zimmerman, PhD, University of North Carolina, Chapel Hill, NC. The Journal has an international editorial board.

Editors-in-Chief
 Dan Osterweil (2000-2006)
 John E. Morley (2007–2017)
 Philip Sloane and Sheryl Zimmerman (2018-Present)

Article Types
JAMDA publishes the following types of articles and editorial content:

 Editorials
 Special Articles
 Updates from the AMDA Meeting
 Review Articles
 Original Study Articles
 Clinical Experience
 Brief Reports
 Quality Improvement in Long Term Care
 Long Term Care Around the Globe
 Controversies in Long Term Care
 Case Reports
 In the Trenches
 In Touch
 Letter to the Editor
 Book Reviews

References

External links
 
 Submission website
 Sponsor American Medical Directors Association
 

Gerontology journals
Publications established in 2001
Elsevier academic journals
English-language journals
Academic journals associated with learned and professional societies of the United States
Bimonthly journals